The 1932 California Golden Bears football team was an American football team that represented the University of California in the Pacific Coast Conference (PCC) during the 1932 college football season. In its second season under head coach Bill Ingram, the team compiled a 7–3–2 record (2–2–1 in conference), tied for fifth place in the PCC, and outscored its opponents by a total of 169 to 89.

Schedule

References

California
California Golden Bears football seasons
California Golden Bears football